Henry Benjamin Greenberg (born Hyman Greenberg; January 1, 1911 – September 4, 1986), nicknamed "Hammerin' Hank", "Hankus Pankus", or "The Hebrew Hammer", was an American professional baseball player and team executive. He played in Major League Baseball (MLB), primarily for the Detroit Tigers as a first baseman in the 1930s and 1940s. A member of the Baseball Hall of Fame and a two-time Most Valuable Player (MVP) Award winner, he was one of the premier power hitters of his generation and is widely considered one of the greatest sluggers in baseball history. He had 47 months of military service including service in World War II, all of which took place during what would have been prime years in his major league career.

Greenberg played the first twelve of his 13 major league seasons for Detroit. He was an American League (AL) All-Star for four seasons and an AL MVP in 1935 (first baseman) and 1940 (left fielder). He had a batting average over .300 in eight seasons, and won two World Series championships with the Tigers ( and ). He was the AL home run leader four times and his 58 home runs for the Tigers in 1938 equaled Jimmie Foxx's 1932 mark for the most in one season by anyone other than Babe Ruth, and tied Foxx for the most home runs between Ruth's record 60 in 1927 and Roger Maris' record 61 in 1961. Greenberg was the first major league player to hit 25 or more home runs in a season in each league, and remains the AL record-holder for most runs batted in in a single season by a right-handed batter (183 in 1937, a 154-game schedule). 
His career statistics would have certainly been higher had he not served in the armed services during wartime. In 1947, Greenberg signed a contract for a record $85,000 salary before being sold to the Pittsburgh Pirates, where he played his final MLB season that year. After retiring from playing, Greenberg continued to work in baseball as a team executive for the Cleveland Indians and Chicago White Sox.

Greenberg was the first Jewish superstar in American team sports. He attracted national attention in 1934 in the middle of a pennant race when he had to decide whether to play baseball on two major Jewish holidays; after consultation with his rabbi, he agreed to play on Rosh Hashanah, but on Yom Kippur he spent the day at his synagogue, even though he was not particularly observant religiously. Having endured his share of anti-semitic abuse in his career, Greenberg was one of the few opposing players to publicly welcome African-American player Jackie Robinson to the major leagues in 1947.

Early life
Hank Greenberg was born Hyman Greenberg on January 1, 1911, in Greenwich Village, New York City, to Romanian Orthodox Jewish parents, David (1883-1969) and Sarah Greenberg (1881-1951), who had emigrated from Bucharest. The family owned a successful cloth-shrinking plant in New York. He had two brothers, Ben (1906-1994), four years older, and Joe (1915-2001), five years younger, who also played baseball, and a sister, Lillian (1907-1989), two years older. His family moved to the Bronx when he was about seven.

He attended James Monroe High School there, where he was an outstanding all-around athlete and was bestowed with the long-standing nickname of "Bruggy" by his basketball coach. His preferred sport was baseball, and his preferred position was first base. In high school basketball, he was on the Monroe team that won the city championship.

In 1929, the 18-year-old  Greenberg was recruited by the New York Yankees, who already had Lou Gehrig at first base. Greenberg turned them down and instead attended New York University for a semester where he was a member of Sigma Alpha Mu, after which he signed with the Detroit Tigers for $9,000 ($ today).

Professional baseball

Minor leagues
Greenberg played minor league baseball for three years. He played 17 games in 1930 for the Hartford Senators, then played at Raleigh, North Carolina, for the Raleigh Capitals, where he hit .314 with 19 home runs. In 1931, he played at Evansville for the Evansville Hubs in the Illinois–Indiana–Iowa League (.318, 15 homers, 85 RBIs). In 1932, at Beaumont for the Beaumont Exporters in the Texas League, he hit 39 homers with 131 RBIs, won the MVP award, and led Beaumont to the Texas League title.

Major leagues

Early years
Greenberg had played in a single MLB game in 1930, and he was the youngest player (19) to appear in the major leagues that year. In 1933, he rejoined the Tigers and hit .301 while driving in 87 runs. At the same time, he was third in the league in strikeouts (78). 

In 1934, his second major-league season, he hit .339 and helped the Tigers reach their first World Series in 25 years. He led the league in doubles, with 63 (the fourth-highest all-time in a single season), and extra-base hits (96). He was third in the AL in slugging percentage (.600) – behind Jimmie Foxx and Lou Gehrig, but ahead of Babe Ruth, and in RBIs (139), sixth in batting average (.339), seventh in home runs (26), and ninth in on-base percentage (.404).

Late in the 1934 season, he announced that he would not play on September 10, which was Rosh Hashanah, the Jewish New Year, or on September 19, the Day of Atonement, Yom Kippur. Fans grumbled, "Rosh Hashanah comes every year but the Tigers haven't won the pennant since 1909." Greenberg did considerable soul-searching, and discussed the matter with his rabbi; finally he relented and agreed to play on Rosh Hashanah, but stuck with his decision not to play on Yom Kippur. Dramatically, Greenberg hit two home runs in a 2–1 Tigers victory over Boston on Rosh Hashanah. The next day's Detroit Free Press ran the Hebrew lettering for "Happy New Year" across its front page. Columnist and poet Edgar A. Guest expressed the general opinion in a poem titled "Speaking of Greenberg", in which he used the Irish (and thus Catholic) names Murphy and Mulroney. The poem ends with the lines "We shall miss him on the infield and shall miss him at the bat / But he's true to his religion—and I honor him for that." The complete text of the poem is at the end of Greenberg's biography page at the website of the International Jewish Sports Hall of Fame. The Detroit press was not so kind regarding the Yom Kippur decision, nor were many fans, but Greenberg in his autobiography recalled that he received a standing ovation from congregants at Congregation Shaarey Zedek when he arrived. Absent Greenberg, the Tigers lost to the New York Yankees, 5–2. The Tigers went on to face the St. Louis Cardinals in the 1934 World Series.

In 1935, Greenberg led the league in RBIs (168), total bases (389), and extra base hits (98), tied Foxx for the AL title in home runs (36), was 2nd in the league in doubles (46), slugging percentage (.628), was 3rd in the league in triples (16), and in runs scored (121), 6th in on-base percentage (.411) and walks (87), and was 7th in batting average (.328). He was unanimously voted the American League's Most Valuable Player. By the All-Star break that season, Greenberg hit 25 home runs and set an MLB record (still standing) of 103 RBIs—but was not selected to the AL All-Star roster (both managers put themselves on the rosters but did not play). He helped lead the Tigers to their first World Series title, but sprained his wrist in the second game and did not play in the other 4 games.

In 1936, Greenberg re-injured his wrist in a collision with Jake Powell of the Washington Senators in April and did not play the remainder of the season. He finished the season with 16 hits, 1 home run, and 15 RBIs in 12 games.

In 1937, Greenberg recovered from his injury and was voted to the AL All-Star roster, but did not play. On September 19, 1937, he hit the first home run into the center-field bleachers at Yankee Stadium. He led the AL by driving in 184 runs (third all-time, behind Hack Wilson in 1930 and Lou Gehrig in 1931), and in extra-base hits (103), while batting .337 with 200 hits. He was second in the league in home runs (40), doubles (49), total bases (397), slugging percentage (.668), and walks (102), third in on-base percentage (.436), and seventh in batting average (.337). Greenberg came in third in the vote for MVP.

A prodigious home run hitter, Greenberg narrowly missed breaking Babe Ruth's single-season home run record in 1938, when he hit 58 home runs, leading the league for the second time. That year, he had 11 games with multiple home runs, a new major league record. Sammy Sosa tied the record in 1998. Greenberg matched what was then the single-season home run record by a right-handed batter, (Jimmie Foxx, 1932); the mark stood for 66 years until it was broken by Sammy Sosa and Mark McGwire. Greenberg also had a 59th home run washed away in a rainout. It has been long speculated that Greenberg was intentionally walked late in the season to prevent him from breaking Ruth's record, but Greenberg dismissed this speculation, calling it "crazy stories". Howard Megdal has calculated that in September 1938, Greenberg was walked in over 20% of his plate appearances, above his average for the season. However, more detailed analysis points out that Greenberg walked just as often in April and May of the 1938 season, and that his excess walks in September came well before he threatened Ruth's record.

Greenberg was again voted to the AL All-Star roster in 1938, but because he was not named to the 1935 AL All-Star roster and was benched in the 1937 game, he declined to accept a starting position on the 1938 AL team and did not play (the NL won 4–1). He led the league in runs scored (144) and at-bats per home run (9.6), tied for the AL lead in walks (119), was second in RBIs (146), slugging percentage (.683), and total bases (380), and third in OBP (.438) and set a still-standing major league record of 39 homers in his home park, the newly re-configured Briggs Stadium. He also set a major-league record with 11 multiple-home run games. He came in third in the vote for MVP.

In 1939 Greenberg was voted to the AL All-Star roster for the third year in a row and was a starter at first base, and singled and walked in four at-bats (AL won 3–1). He finished second in the AL in home runs (33) and strikeouts (95), third in doubles (42) and slugging percentage (.622), fourth in RBIs (112), sixth in walks (91), and ninth in on-base percentage (.420).

After the 1939 season ended, Greenberg was asked by general manager Jack Zeller to take a salary cut of $5,000 ($ today) as a result of his off-year in power and run production. He was asked to move from first base to the outfield to accommodate Rudy York, who was one of the best young hitters of his generation; York was tried at catcher, third baseman, and outfielder and proved to be a defensive liability at each position. Greenberg in turn, demanded a $10,000 bonus if he mastered the outfield, insisting he was the one taking the risk in learning a new position. Greenberg received his bonus at the end of spring training.

In 1940, Greenberg switched from playing the first base position to the left field position. For the 4th consecutive time, he was voted by the season's AL All-Star team manager to the AL All-Star team. In the bottom of the 6th inning, Greenberg and Lou Finney were sent into the game to replace right fielder Charlie Keller and left fielder Ted Williams with Greenberg playing in left field and Finney in right field. Greenberg batted twice in the game and fouled out to the catcher two times. The NL won the game 4–0. That season, he led the AL in home runs for the third time in 6 years with 41; in RBIs (150), doubles (50), total bases (384), extra-base hits (99), at-bats per home run (14.0), and slugging percentage (.670; 44 points ahead of Joe DiMaggio). He was second in the league behind Williams in runs scored (129) and OBP (.433), all while batting .340 (fifth-best in the AL). He also led the Tigers to the AL pennant, and won his second American League MVP award, becoming the first player in major-league history to win an MVP award at two different playing positions.

He admitted in his autobiography after his career ended that he had taken part in sign stealing in September of the 1940 season, which was inspired by teammates Tommy Bridges and Pinky Higgins, who noticed that the new rifle they used for their hunt had a telescopic lens that could read signs when in the stands in the outfield.

World War II service
On October 16, 1940, Greenberg became the first American League player to register for the nation's first peacetime draft. In the spring of 1941, the Detroit draft board initially classified Greenberg as 4F for "flat feet" after his first physical for military service and was recommended for light duty. The rumors that he had bribed the board, and concern that he would be likened to Jack Dempsey who had received negative publicity for failure to serve in World War I, led Greenberg to request to be reexamined. On April 18, he was found fit for regular military service and was reclassified.

On May 7, 1941, he was inducted into the U.S. Army after playing left field in 19 games and reported to Fort Custer at Battle Creek, Michigan. His salary was cut from $55,000 ($ today) a year to $21 ($ today) a month. He was not bitter, and stated, "I made up my mind to go when I was called. My country comes first." In November, while serving as an anti-tank gunner, he was promoted to sergeant, but was honorably discharged on December 5 (the United States Congress released men aged 28 years and older from service), two days before Japan bombed Pearl Harbor.

Greenberg re-enlisted as a sergeant on February 1, 1942, and volunteered for service in the Army Air Forces, becoming the first major league player to do so. He graduated from Officer Candidate School and was commissioned as a first lieutenant in the Air Corps (the new "Air Forces" service retaining the old name for its own logistics and training elements) and was assigned to the Physical Education Program. In February 1944, he was sent to the U.S. Army Special Services school. Promoted to captain, he requested overseas duty later that year and served in the China-Burma-India Theater for over six months, scouting locations for B-29 bomber bases and was a physical training officer with the 58th Bomber Wing. He was a Special Services officer of the 20th Bomber Command, 20th Air Force in China when it began bombing Japan on June 15. He was ordered to New York, and in late 1944, to Richmond, Virginia. Greenberg served 47 months, the longest of any major league player.

Return to baseball
Greenberg remained in military uniform until he was placed on the military inactive list and discharged from the U.S. Army on June 14, 1945. He was the first major league player to return to MLB after the war. He returned to the Tigers team, and in his first game back on July 1, he homered. The All-Star Game scheduled for July 10 had been officially cancelled on April 24 and MLB did not name All-Stars that season due to strict travel restrictions during the last days of the war with Germany and Japan and the ending of World War II. In place of the All-Star Game, seven interleague games were played (eight had been scheduled) on July 9 and 10 to benefit the American Red Cross and the War Relief fund. An Associated Press All-Star roster was named (no game was played) for the AL and NL by a group of their sportswriters that included Greenberg as one of the All-Stars.

Greenberg, who played left field in 72 games and batted .311 in 1945, helped lead the Tigers to a come-from-behind American League pennant, clinching it with a grand slam home run in the dark—there were no lights in Sportsman's Park in St. Louis—ninth inning of the final game of the season. The ump—former Yankee pitching star of the 1920s Murderers Row team George Pipgras—supposedly said, "Sorry Hank, but I'm gonna have to call the game. I can't see the ball." Greenberg replied, "Don't worry, George, I can see it just fine", so the game continued. It ended with Greenberg's grand slam on the next pitch, clinching Hal Newhouser's 25th victory of the season. His home run allowed the Tigers to clinch the pennant and avoid a one-game playoff (that would have been necessary without the win) against the now-second-place Washington Senators. The Tigers went on to beat the Cubs in the World Series in seven games. Only three home runs were hit in that World Series. Phil Cavarretta hit a home run for the Cubs in Game One, Greenberg hit a homer in Game Two, where he batted in three runs in a 4–1 Tigers win, and he hit a two-run homer in Game Six in the eighth inning that tied the score 8–8; the Cubs went on to win that game with a run in the bottom of the 12th.

In 1946, he returned to peak form and playing at first base. He led the AL in home runs (44) and RBIs (127), both for the fourth time. He was second in slugging percentage (.604) and total bases (316) behind Ted Williams.

In 1947, Greenberg and the Tigers had a lengthy salary dispute. When Greenberg decided to retire rather than play for less, Detroit sold his contract to the Pittsburgh Pirates. To persuade him not to retire, Pittsburgh made Greenberg the first baseball player to earn over $80,000 ($ today) in a season as pure salary (though the exact amount is a matter of some dispute). Team co-owner Bing Crosby recorded a song, "Goodbye, Mr. Ball, Goodbye" with Groucho Marx and Greenberg to celebrate Greenberg's arrival. The Pirates also reduced the size of Forbes Field's cavernous left field, renaming the section "Greenberg Gardens" to accommodate Greenberg's pull-hitting style. Greenberg played first base for the Pirates in 1947 and was one of the few opposing players to publicly welcome Jackie Robinson to the majors.

That year he also had a chance to mentor a young future Hall-of-Famer, the 24-year-old Ralph Kiner. Said Greenberg, "Ralph had a natural home run swing. All he needed was somebody to teach him the value of hard work and self-discipline. Early in the morning on off-days, every chance we got, we worked on hitting." Kiner would go on to hit 51 home runs that year to lead the National League.

In his final season of 1947, Greenberg tied for the league lead in walks with 104, with a .408 on-base percentage and finished eighth in the league in home runs and tenth in slugging percentage. Greenberg became the first major league player to hit 25 or more home runs in a season in each league. Johnny Mize became the second in 1950.

Nevertheless, Greenberg retired as a player to take a front-office post with the Cleveland Indians. No player had ever retired after a final season in which they hit so many home runs. Since then, only Ted Williams (1960, 29), Dave Kingman (1986; 35), Mark McGwire (2001; 29), Barry Bonds (2007; 28) and David Ortiz (2016; 38) have hit as many or more homers in their final season.

Through 2010, he was first in career home runs and RBIs (ahead of Shawn Green), second in batting average (ahead of Ryan Braun), and fourth in hits (ahead of Brad Ausmus), among all-time Jewish major league baseball players.

As a fielder, the  Greenberg was awkward and unsure of himself early in his career, but mastered first base through countless hours of practice. Over the course of his career he demonstrated a higher-than-average fielding percentage and range at first base. When asked to move to left field in 1940 to make room for Rudy York, he worked tirelessly to conquer that position as well, reducing his errors in the outfield from 15 in 1940 to 0 in 1945.

Greenberg felt that runs batted in were more important than home runs. He would tell his teammates, "just get on base", or "just get the runner to third", and he would do the rest.

Final seasons
Greenberg would likely have approached 500 home runs and 1,800 RBIs had he not served in the military. As it was, he compiled 331 home runs, 1,051 runs and 1,276 RBI in a 1,394-game career. Greenberg was also an excellent contact hitter, earning a lifetime batting average of .313. Starring as a first baseman and outfielder with the Tigers (1930, 1933–46) and doing duty only briefly with the Pirates (1947), Greenberg played only nine full seasons. He missed all but 19 games of the 1941 season, the three full seasons that followed, and most of 1945 to World War II military service and missed most of another season with a broken wrist.

Management and ownership

After the 1947 season, Greenberg retired as a player, and Cleveland Indians owner Bill Veeck hired him as the Indians' farm director. When Veeck was forced to sell the Indians due to a divorce settlement, new owner Ellis Ryan retained Greenberg, promoting him to general manager. During his tenure, he sponsored more African American players than any other major league executive. Greenberg's contributions to the Cleveland farm system led to the team's successes throughout the 1950s, although Bill James once wrote that the Indians' late 1950s collapse should also be attributed to him. In 1949, Larry Doby also recommended Greenberg scout three players Doby used to play with in the Negro leagues: Hank Aaron, Ernie Banks, and Willie Mays. The next offseason Doby asked what Indians' scouts said about his recommendations. Said Greenberg, "Our guys checked 'em out and their reports were not good. They said that Aaron has a hitch in his swing and will never hit good pitching. Banks is too slow and didn't have enough range [at shortstop], and Mays can't hit a curveball." 

While Ryan had initially been content to leave baseball matters to Greenberg, he tried to seize greater control after the 1952 season, when the Indians suffered a drop in attendance despite coming within two games of the pennant. The Indians board sided with Greenberg, prompting Ryan to sell out to a group headed by Myron H. Wilson, who voiced full confidence in Greenberg. Under Wilson, Greenberg's role as operating head of the franchise was cemented to the point that he represented the Indians at owners meetings alongside vice president and board member George Medinger. During this time, he and Pirates owner John W. Galbreath helped negotiate an amended player pension plan in which the players got 60 percent of television revenues from the All-Star Game and World Series. In 1953, he was partly responsible for an important change to baseball's waivers rule. In previous seasons, once a player passed through waivers in his team's league (the AL or NL), any team from the other league could acquire him, a detail the Yankees used to often outbid other AL teams for NL players. Greenberg successfully campaigned for a new rule that, after June 15, required players to pass through waivers in both leagues before teams in the other league could attempt to obtain them.

Greenberg's influence grew even more in 1956 when he joined a syndicate headed by Bill Daley that bought the Indians from Wilson. Although Greenberg had been operating head of the franchise since 1950, this was the first time that he had been a part-owner. However, in 1957, he was forced to resign as general manager, as he put it, "in order to satisfy a hostile press." He remained a part-owner, however, and in 1958 tried to buy out Daley and become principal owner. He intended to serve as his own general manager if successful. However, Daley and several other directors bought him out.

In 1959, Greenberg and Veeck teamed up for a second time when they led a syndicate that purchased the Chicago White Sox; Veeck served as team president with Greenberg as vice president and general manager. During Veeck and Greenberg's first season, the White Sox won their first AL pennant since 1919. Veeck would sell his shares in the White Sox in 1961, and Greenberg stepped down as general manager on August 26 of that season.

After the 1960 season, the American League announced plans to put a team in Los Angeles. Greenberg immediately became the favorite to become the new team's first owner and persuaded Veeck to join him as his partner. However, when Dodgers owner Walter O'Malley got wind of these developments, he threatened to scuttle the whole deal by invoking his exclusive rights to operate a major league team in southern California. In truth, O'Malley wanted no part of competing against an expansion team owned by a master promoter such as Veeck, even if he was only a minority partner. Greenberg wouldn't budge and pulled out of the running for what became the Los Angeles Angels. Greenberg later became a successful investment banker, briefly returning to baseball as a minority partner with Veeck when the latter repurchased the White Sox in 1975.

On September 20, 1961, Greenberg along with Bob Neal called a baseball game for ABC between the New York Yankees and Baltimore Orioles.

Personal life
Greenberg married Caral Gimbel (daughter of Bernard Gimbel, of the Gimbels department store family) on February 18, 1946, three days after signing a $60,000 ($ today) contract with the Tigers. The couple had three children—sons Glenn H. Greenberg and Stephen and a daughter, Alva—before divorcing in 1958. Their son, Stephen, played five years in the Washington Senators/Texas Rangers organization. In 1995, Stephen Greenberg co-founded Classic Sports Network with Brian Bedol, which was purchased by ESPN and became ESPN Classic. He also was the chairman of CSTV, the first cable network devoted exclusively to college sports.

In 1966, Greenberg married Mary Jo Tarola, a minor actress who appeared on-screen as Linda Douglas, and remained with her until his death. They had no children.

Greenberg died of metastatic kidney cancer in Beverly Hills, California, in 1986, and his remains were entombed at Hillside Memorial Park Cemetery, in Culver City, California.

MLB honors

 All-Star (AL), 1937–1940.
 Most Valuable Player (AL), 1935 and 1940.
 National Baseball Hall of Fame, 1956 (First player of Jewish descent elected to the Hall of Fame garnering 85% of the votes)
 Sunday June 12, 1983: The Detroit Tigers retired Greenberg's uniform number 5 during "Greenberg-Gehringer Day" at Tiger Stadium (former teammate Charlie Gehringer's uniform number 2 was also retired). Both Greenberg and Gehringer attended the ceremony.
1999: Major League Baseball All-Century Team nominee.

Other honors

 Associated Press All-Star (AL), 1945.
 International Jewish Sports Hall of Fame, 1979.
 Jewish American Hall of Fame, 1991.
 Michigan Sports Hall of Fame, 1958.
 National Jewish Sports Hall of Fame, 1996.
 In 2013, the Bob Feller Act of Valor Award honored Greenberg as one of 37 Baseball Hall of Fame members for his service in the United States Army Air Force during World War II.

Miscellaneous
Incidents of anti-Semitism Greenberg faced included having players stare at him and having racial slurs thrown at him by spectators and sometimes opposing players. Examples of these imprecations were: "Hey Mo!" (referring to the Jewish prophet Moses) and "Throw a pork chop—he can't hit that!" (a reference to Jewish kosher laws). In the 1935 World Series umpire George Moriarty warned some Chicago Cubs players to stop yelling anti-Semitic slurs at Greenberg and eventually cleared the players from the Cubs bench. Moriarty was disciplined for this action by then-commissioner Kenesaw Mountain Landis.

Greenberg befriended Jackie Robinson after he signed with the Dodgers in 1947, and encouraged him; Robinson credited Greenberg with helping him through the difficulties of his rookie year.

In an article in 1976 in Esquire magazine, sportswriter Harry Stein published an "All Time All-Star Argument Starter", consisting of five ethnic baseball teams. Greenberg was the first baseman on Stein's Jewish team.

In 2006, Greenberg was featured on a United States postage stamp. The stamp is one of a block of four honoring "baseball sluggers", the others being Mickey Mantle, Mel Ott, and Roy Campanella.

In media

Films
The Life and Times of Hank Greenberg directed by Aviva Kempner, Copyright 2013 The Ciesla Foundation, which won a Peabody Award in 2001.

Books

See also

 
1935 Detroit Tigers season
List of Major League Baseball home run records
List of Major League Baseball doubles records
50 home run club
List of Major League Baseball career home run leaders
List of Major League Baseball career runs scored leaders
List of Major League Baseball career runs batted in leaders
List of Major League Baseball annual runs batted in leaders
List of Major League Baseball annual home run leaders
List of Major League Baseball annual runs scored leaders
List of Major League Baseball annual doubles leaders
List of select Jewish baseball players
Major League Baseball titles leaders
Moe Berg – famous Jewish baseball player

Notes

References

External links

Hank Greenberg website
The Life and Times of Hank Greenberg website

1911 births
1986 deaths
American League All-Stars
American League home run champions
American League Most Valuable Player Award winners
American League RBI champions
United States Army Air Forces personnel of World War II
American Orthodox Jews
American people of Romanian-Jewish descent
American sportsmen
Beaumont Exporters players
Bronx Tigers players
Burials at Hillside Memorial Park Cemetery
Chicago White Sox executives
Cleveland Indians executives
Deaths from cancer in California
Deaths from kidney cancer
Detroit Tigers players
Evansville Hubs players
Hartford Senators players
International Jewish Sports Hall of Fame inductees
Jewish American baseball players
Jewish Major League Baseball players
Major League Baseball first basemen
Major League Baseball players with retired numbers
Military personnel from New York City
National Baseball Hall of Fame inductees
New York University alumni
People from Greenwich Village
Pittsburgh Pirates players
Raleigh Capitals players
Sportspeople from Manhattan
Sportspeople from the Bronx
Baseball players from New York City
United States Army Air Forces officers
Gimbel family
James Monroe High School (New York City) alumni
United States Army soldiers